The Monne is a small torrential river that originates in the Puy-de-Dôme, near the col de la Croix-Morand, above the village of Mareuge, at  above sea level.

Geography 
The Monne is part of a hydrographical whole, draining les monts Dore. The system is made up of rivers flowing eastward into the river Allier in the plains of the Limagne. To the south lies le pays des Couzes with, from south: la Couze d'Ardes, la Couze Pavin and la Couze Chambon; beyond flows la Monne and the Veyre. Continuing north one finds other rivers feeding from la chaîne des Domes : l'Auzon, l'Artière and la Tiretaine which flows through Royat and Clermont-Ferrand.

All rivers descending more than  down to about  etch the granitic ridge of la faille des Limagnes +/- deeply from west to east. The most wild and spectacular gorges are those of la Monne located between Olloix and Cournols.

References 

Rivers of France
Rivers of Auvergne-Rhône-Alpes
Rivers of Puy-de-Dôme